Martin Dúbravka (born 15 January 1989) is a Slovak professional footballer who plays as a goalkeeper for  club Newcastle United and the Slovakia national team.

After playing in the top flights of Slovak, Danish and Czech football, Dúbravka joined English club Newcastle United in January 2018, initially on loan. He won the club's Player of the Year award in the 2019–20 season. He spent part of the 2022–23 season on loan at Manchester United, playing twice in their EFL Cup-winning campaign.

Dúbravka represented Slovakia at under-21 level, before making his senior international debut in May 2014. He started all three of Slovakia's games at UEFA Euro 2020.

Early life
As a child, Dúbravka enjoyed playing ice hockey as well as football, and could have moved into the former sport were it not for a leg injury he sustained when he was five years old.

Club career

Žilina
In the 2009–10 Slovak Superliga he played 26 Slovak Superliga games, finishing as a league champion. He became a first choice after the transfer of Dušan Perniš in January 2010. He qualified with Žilina to the 2010–11 UEFA Champions League and played all 6 group games. He kept a clean sheet in the play-off round against Sparta Prague.

Esbjerg
On 30 January 2014, he signed a 3½-year deal with the Danish Superliga club Esbjerg.

Slovan Liberec
Dúbravka joined Slovan Liberec of the Czech First League in July 2016 on a one-year contract.

Sparta Prague 
He joined Sparta Prague in June 2017, signing a three-year contract.

Newcastle United
In January 2018, Newcastle United showed interest in Dúbravka, initially offering Sparta Prague a loan for €500,000, with an option to sign in the summer for €4.5 million. He finally joined the Premier League side on 31 January 2018, the final day of the winter transfer window on a half-year loan deal, due to expire at the end of 2017–18 season. According to isport.cz, he joined the club for €2 million, with an option to sign in the summer for €4 million. He made his debut on 11 February, playing a pivotal role and keeping a clean sheet in a 1–0 win against Manchester United.

After a very successful loan spell, he signed permanently for Newcastle on 30 May 2018 for an undisclosed fee of around €5 million. On 17 February 2019 in Durham, Dúbravka was recognised as the 2018 Player of the Year by the North East Football Writers' Association, joining the likes of Alan Shearer, Kevin Keegan and Shay Given. He became the seventh goalkeeper to win the award, over its thirty-nine seasons. Dúbravka stated that he was happy to win the award because "amazing players have won this trophy before". FourFourTwo ranked Dúbravka as the twentieth best player of the Premier League, in the 2018–19 season. He was the highest ranked goalkeeper, ahead of highly valued goalkeepers such as Alisson Becker (Liverpool) and David de Gea (Manchester United).

While Dúbravka was ever present for Newcastle for the next two seasons, he was mostly replaced in the FA Cup and EFL Cup, by either Karl Darlow or Freddie Woodman. His performances during the 2019–20 season, saw him win the club's Player of the Year award. In August 2020, Dúbravka injured his ankle in a training session prior to the start of the 2020–21 season. Darlow played in his absence and he returned to the bench for the club's last match of the year, a 0–0 draw with Liverpool. On 9 January 2021, Dúbravka started his first match of the season, in a FA Cup extra-time loss to Arsenal. On 27 February, Dúbravka started his first league match of the season in a 1–1 draw with Wolverhampton Wanderers. Afterwards, he went on to make twelve more appearances in goal as Newcastle, despite having been in a relegation battle for much of the season, finished in twelfth place.

Loan to Manchester United
Dúbravka lost his place in the starting line-up to Nick Pope after the England international signed from Burnley. On 1 September 2022, he joined Manchester United on a season-long loan from Newcastle. On 3 September 2022, it was confirmed that he would wear the number 31 shirt last worn by Nemanja Matić. He made his debut in United's 4–2 win over Aston Villa in the EFL Cup third round on 10 November 2022. Newcastle recalled Dúbravka from the loan on 1 January 2023. He made two appearances, both in the 2022–23 EFL Cup, keeping one clean sheet.

Return to Newcastle
Dúbravka played in Newcastle's 2–1 FA Cup third round defeat to Sheffield Wednesday. He made his first Premier League appearance since the last day of the previous season on 18 February 2023, replacing Elliot Anderson after Nick Pope was sent off for handling the ball outside the penalty area in the 2–0 home defeat to Liverpool. Dúbravka was cup-tied for the 2023 EFL Cup final on 26 February, having played for Newcastle's opponents in the third and fourth rounds, which Manchester United won 2–0.

International career
Dúbravka made 10 appearances for the Slovakia under-21 team. On 23 May 2014, Dúbravka made his debut for the Slovakia national football team in a 2–0 win over Montenegro.

In January 2017, he played his first full game for the national team, having played 45 minutes in both of his previous matches. While he was benched against Uganda (3–1 loss), on 12 January he was fielded in an unofficial friendly match against Sweden in Abu Dhabi, United Arab Emirates. Slovakia lost the game 6–0, despite only trailing 1–0 at half time. This match also marked the first time Dúbravka conceded in the national team and he was also Slovak captain for the game, being the most experienced with international football.

He made his competitive debut in a 2018 FIFA World Cup qualifier, against Lithuania (2–1 win), on 10 June 2017, when the preferred goalkeeper in the qualification, Matúš Kozáčik, was unavailable due to injury. He however achieved his first competitive clean sheet on 1 September in a home qualifier against Slovenia. Slovakia won thanks to an 81st-minute goal by Adam Nemec. Just as in the previous cap, Dúbravka was chosen due to a prolonged injury of Kozáčik. After Kozáčik's return to the squad, Dúbravka remained the preferred choice for the remaining matches against England, Scotland and Malta. In the match against Scotland, Dúbravka made a series of saves before he was finally beaten by an own goal from Martin Škrtel.

Dúbravka missed all the national team fixtures of 2020 due to injuries ruling him out of play during the autumn of the year, he returned to the national team in March 2021, in a 0–0 draw with Cyprus. He made notable saves in the second half preventing and upset loss and received some praise for them, while the team received overall criticisms for the upset result and the performance labelled as "boring".

He was named in Slovakia's final squad for UEFA Euro 2020, where he played in all three group matches. Going into the match against Spain on 23 June, Slovakia had a slim chance to advance to the knockout stage as a third-placed team. Dúbravka started well, saving a penalty from Álvaro Morata in the twelfth minute. After a shot from Pablo Sarabia hit the crossbar, he tried to tip the ball away and instead punched the ball into his own net. In doing so, he became the first goalkeeper in European Championship history, to save a penalty and score an own goal in the same match. Dúbravka would go on to concede four goals, as Spain won the match 5–0.

Style of play
Dúbravka is a third-generation goalkeeper: his father and grandfather also played in the position. Dúbravka has been dubbed the "quintessential sweeper-keeper" due to his "outstanding footwork" and he believes "in modern football the keeper's almost like a libero. You need to play with the ball, not just kick it long".

Louise Taylor of The Guardian christened Dúbravka the "reluctant keeper" after he admitted his favourite position to play is right wing; he sometimes plays as an outfielder in training and coaching staff have suggested that he switch to a midfield role.

Personal life
Dúbravka lives with his girlfriend Lucia, and his dog. The couple had their first child in March 2021.

Career statistics

Club

International

Honours
Žilina
Slovak Superliga: 2009–10, 2011–12
Slovak Super Cup: 2010

Manchester United
EFL Cup: 2022–23

Slovakia
King's Cup: 2018

Individual
Newcastle United Player of the Year: 2019–20

References

External links

Profile at the Newcastle United F.C. website

1989 births
Living people
Sportspeople from Žilina
Slovak footballers
Association football goalkeepers
MŠK Žilina players
Esbjerg fB players
FC Slovan Liberec players
AC Sparta Prague players
Newcastle United F.C. players
Manchester United F.C. players
Slovak Super Liga players
Danish Superliga players
Czech First League players
Premier League players
UEFA Euro 2020 players
Slovakia youth international footballers
Slovakia under-21 international footballers
Slovakia international footballers
Slovak expatriate footballers
Expatriate footballers in the Czech Republic
Expatriate men's footballers in Denmark
Expatriate footballers in England
Slovak expatriate sportspeople in the Czech Republic
Slovak expatriate sportspeople in Denmark
Slovak expatriate sportspeople in England